Françoise is a compilation album by the French popular singer Françoise Hardy. After her break with Vogue in 1969, Hardy made this album, produced by Hypopotam, her recently created record label, and distributed it through Sonopresse. The first edition released in France in 1970.

Composition of this compilation album 
2 songs in French language of the album Ma jeunesse fout le camp… (A4-B3), 
2 songs in French language of the album Comment te dire adieu (A5-B5),
1 song in English language of the album En anglais (B1),
1 song in German language of the album Träume (A1),
6 last songs in French language produced by Asparagus, published on singles under label Vogue from June, 1968 at September, 1969 (A2-A3-A6-B2-B4-B6).

Track listing 
Orchestras : Saint-Preux (A1), Jean-Pierre Sabar (A2-A3-A5-A6-B2-B4), Charles Blackwell (A4-B1-B3), John Cameron (B5) & Jean-Claude Vannier (B6).

References 

Françoise Hardy albums
1970 compilation albums